Egbert of Lindisfarne (or Ecgberht) was Bishop of Lindisfarne from his consecration on 11 June 803 until his death in 821.  He is often confused with Saint Egbert who served as a monk at Lindisfarne, though the latter never became a bishop there.

To Egbert of Lindisfarne was dedicated the Latin poem De abbatibus by a monk in one of the dependent houses of Lindisfarne.

Citations

References

External links 
 

8th-century births
821 deaths
Bishops of Lindisfarne
9th-century English bishops